"The Storyteller" is the first segment of the twenty-seventh episode, the third episode of the second season (1986–87) of the television series The Twilight Zone. In this segment a young boy keeps his ancestor alive using a technique similar to that employed by Scheherazade in One Thousand and One Nights: telling him a story each night and going to bed in the midst of the story.

Plot
Retired teacher Dorothy Livingston is visiting her niece when she bumps into a man she recognizes. Dorothy and her niece follow him and Dorothy tells her niece how she met the man in 1933.

Dorothy was assigned to a school in West Virginia and replaced a teacher who told her that Mica Frost, one of her students, should be allowed access to the library at all times. She meets Mica and discovers that he enjoys scribbling in his notebook. She believes Mica's behavior to be unusual and asks him to schedule a parent-teacher conference. Mica informs her that his parents are dead and he lives with his grandfather, who he refuses to let her meet.

Mica secretly takes extra books home. Dorothy visits and finds that the boy is reading the books to his ailing grandfather. Mica now confesses that the old man is not his grandfather but actually his great-great-great-grandfather, who he claims to be 133 years old. He says he has kept the old man alive by reading to him a story every night, but never finishing the story until the next night, claiming the suspense is the only thing keeping the old man alive. He claims he's continuing the tradition as his father and grandfather did.

The next morning at school, Mica falls from a tree, hits his head, and breaks his arm. He is taken to the town doctor to spend the night but he fights back because no one will be home to keep his "grandfather" alive. Dorothy goes to their house and tells his grandfather a story she makes up on the fly. The next day, Mica rushes home to find that his grandfather still alive and well. Dorothy tells Mica that she still does not believe in his storytelling method but thought it would not hurt to tell one just in case.

Back in the present, the adult Mica enters an apartment building followed closely by Dorothy and her niece. As they sneak into Mica's apartment, Dorothy is heard narrating the events at some future date. As she pauses in the narrative, her mother asks excitedly, "Is the old man there? Is he 200 years old?" Dorothy answers: "I can't say, mother. Not until tomorrow." and leaves with the old woman waiting for tomorrow’s story.

External links
 

The Twilight Zone (1985 TV series season 2) episodes
1986 American television episodes
Fiction set in 1933
Television episodes about immortality

fr:Le Conteur